Katherine A. High is an American doctor-scientist who is an emeritus professor at the Perelman School of Medicine at the University of Pennsylvania. She was the co-founder, president, and chief scientific officer of Spark Therapeutics and currently serves as President of Therapeutics at AskBio.  Her career has focused on pioneering work in the area of gene therapy, with many accomplishments in basic, translational, and clinical investigation in gene therapy.

Education 
High received an A.B. in chemistry at Harvard University in 1972. She started her medical training at the University of North Carolina (UNC) School of Medicine, during which she took a leave of absence to work in a chemistry research lab at UNC. After returning and completing her medical degree in 1978, High continued with a residency in internal medicine. She then became a hematology fellow at Yale University under the supervision of Edward J Benz Jr, during which she worked on the molecular genetics of globin genes and oncogenes.

Career and research 
High has been recognized for her distinguished contributions to the field of gene therapy, having designed, sponsored, and conducted the first clinical trial of an adeno-associated viral vector (AAV) gene therapy injected into the skeletal muscle (1999), the first trial of AAV gene therapy introduced into the liver (2001),  and the first trial in the US of an AAV gene therapy injected into the subretinal space (2007). 

High was a faculty member at the University of North Carolina - Chapel Hill for seven years, where she started her career by developing a canine model of the study of gene therapy for hemophilia by cloning the canine Factor IX gene. She also identified the mutations responsible for several Factor VII and Factor X-deficient blood clotting disorders. High moved to the University of Pennsylvania and Children's Hospital of Philadelphia, where she began pioneering gene therapies for blood disorders. During her career at the University of Pennsylvania, High expanded her research into gene therapy solutions for hereditary blindness together with Dr. Jean Bennett.

She was the director of the Center for Cellular and Molecular Therapeutics, and  head of hematology research, at the Children's Hospital of Philadelphia and an investigator of the Howard Hughes Medical Institute. High is an elected member of the National Academy of Medicine  of the American Academy of Arts and Sciences, and of the Faculty of Pharmaceutical Medicine of the Royal College of Physicians (London).

Along with Jean Bennett, in 2018, she was awarded Sanford Health's $1 million Lorraine Cross Award for innovation in medicine and science.

From 2014 to 2020, High served as the Co-Founder, President, Chief Scientific Officer/Head of R&D and a Member of the Board of Directors of Spark Therapeutics, a fully integrated, commercial gene therapy company in Philadelphia. While at Spark Therapeutics, Dr. High led the team that obtained the first FDA approval of an AAV therapeutic (Luxturna®) in December 2017 and led the team that obtained Breakthrough Therapy designations for three product candidates, SPK-RPE65 (Luxturna®), SPK-9001 for hemophilia B, and for SPK-8011 for hemophilia A.

In February 2020, High stepped down from her position at Spark Therapeutics as the company prepared to be absorbed by Swiss pharma Roche.

In January 2021, High joined Asklepios Biopharmaceutical, or AskBio, a clinical-stage adeno-associated virus (AAV) gene therapy company and wholly owned subsidiary of Bayer AG, as the Company's new President of Therapeutics and as a Board Member for AskBio. In this role, Dr. High is responsible for the development of the Company's for driving the strategic direction and execution of the company’s preclinical and clinical programs.

In April 2021, she was elected a member of the U. S. National Academy of Sciences.

Personal life 
She is married to George Steele, a nutritionist who was on the faculty of the University of Pennsylvania School of Medicine. She has three children, one of whom is actress Sarah Steele.

References

External links 
 Penn Bio

Living people
University of Pennsylvania faculty
Harvard University alumni
University of North Carolina School of Medicine alumni
Fellows of the American Academy of Arts and Sciences
Members of the National Academy of Medicine
American hematologists
Gene therapy
Howard Hughes Medical Investigators
Year of birth missing (living people)
Perelman School of Medicine at the University of Pennsylvania faculty
Women hematologists
20th-century American women physicians
20th-century American physicians
21st-century American women physicians
21st-century American physicians
American women academics
Members of the United States National Academy of Sciences